Philip van Kouwenbergh (1671 – 1729), was an 18th-century flower painter from the Northern Netherlands.

Biography
He was born in Amsterdam. According to the RKD he was a pupil of Elias van den Broeck and is known for flower still lifes.

He lived his whole life in Amsterdam, where he later died.

References

Philip van Kouwenbergh on Artnet

1671 births
1729 deaths
18th-century Dutch painters
18th-century Dutch male artists
Dutch male painters
Painters from Amsterdam
Flower artists